Yury Igorevich Vikulin (born 15 January 1986) is a Russian professional bandy player. He has been playing for the Yenisey since 2015 and has been part of the Russia national bandy team in many world championship competitions.

References

External links
 
 

1986 births
Living people
Russian bandy players
Yenisey Krasnoyarsk players
Russian Bandy Super League players